Christmas Tree EXEC was the first widely disruptive computer worm, which paralyzed several international computer networks in December 1987. The virus ran on the IBM VM/CMS operating system.

Written by a student at the Clausthal University of Technology in the REXX scripting language, it drew a crude Christmas tree as text graphics, then sent itself to each entry in the target's email contacts file. In this way it spread onto the European Academic Research Network (EARN), BITNET, and IBM's worldwide VNET. On all of these systems it caused massive disruption.

The core mechanism of the ILOVEYOU worm of 2000 was essentially the same as Christmas Tree, although it ran on PCs rather than mainframes, was spread over a different network, and was scripted using VBScript rather than REXX.

The name was actually "CHRISTMA EXEC" because the IBM VM systems originally required file names to be formatted as 8+space+8 characters. Additionally, IBM required REXX script files to have a file type of "EXEC". The name is sometimes written as "CHRISTMAS EXEC" (adding a 9th character) to make the name more readable. The user was prompted to: "...just type CHRISTMAS..."—and this in fact launched the "worm". The worm would read the user's CMS NAMES file, which contained a list of users at remote nodes to transmit the worm to. The worm would then use the SENDFILE command to transmit the worm to those remote users, who would presumably run it, repeating the cycle. 

Some versions of the worm had concealed code.  The actual executable part of the worm was contained in several overly long lines (more than 80 characters) that were not visible unless the user scrolled the screen to the right.  The IBM 3279 color terminal would display the christmas tree with some blinking colored characters (asterisks) to represent tree lights.

It displays this message when the program is run and then forwards itself to mailbox addresses contained in the user's address file.
                *
                *
               ***
              *****
             *******
            *********
          *************                A
             *******
           ***********                VERY
         ***************
       *******************            HAPPY
           ***********
         ***************            CHRISTMAS
       *******************
     ***********************         AND MY
         ***************
       *******************         BEST WISHES
     ***********************
   ***************************     FOR THE NEXT
             ******
             ******                    YEAR
             ******


See also
Trojan horse (computing)
Timeline of computer viruses and worms
ASCII art

References

Further reading

External links
 Source code (archived)

Trojan horses
Email worms
Rexx
Hacking in the 1980s
1987 in computing